Taiwanese Americans are Americans who carry full or partial ancestry from Taiwan. This includes American-born citizens who descend from migrants from Taiwan.

As of the 2010 U.S. Census, 49% of Taiwanese Americans lived in the state of California. New York and Texas have the second and third largest Taiwanese American populations, respectively. Notable Taiwanese Americans include Joy Burke, Elaine Chao, Steve Chen, Michael Chang, Yuan Chang, Jensen Huang, Justin Lin, Jeremy Lin, Lisa Su, Katherine Tai, Constance Wu, Michelle Wu, Andrew Yang, and Jerry Yang.

Immigration history 

Taiwanese immigration to the United States was limited in the years before World War II, due to Japanese rule as well as the Immigration Act of 1924, which completely barred immigration from Asia. Prior to the 1950s, emigration from Taiwan (ROC) (then called Formosa), was negligible, but a small number of students came to the United States until 1965. After the passage of the Immigration and Nationality Act of 1965, which loosened restrictions and gave preference to skilled workers, many came as students and stayed, partly due to better economic conditions in the U.S. and due to a repressive political climate back home.

In 1949, the Chinese Communist Party took control of mainland China, and 2 million refugees, predominantly from the Republic of China (ROC) Nationalist government, military, and business community, fled to Taiwan. From 1949 up until 1979, the United States recognized the Kuomintang-led ROC as the sole legitimate government of China. As a result, immigration from Taiwan was counted under within the same quota for both mainland China and Taiwan. However, because the People's Republic of China (PRC) banned emigration to the United States until 1977, the quota for immigrants from China was almost exclusively filled by immigrants from Taiwan. In 1979, the United States broke diplomatic relations with the ROC, while the Taiwan Relations Act gave Taiwan a separate immigration quota from that of the PRC.

Before the late 1960s, immigrants from Taiwan to the United States tended to be "mainland Chinese" who had immigrated to Taiwan with the Kuomintang (KMT) after the fall of mainland China to the Communists. Later immigrants tended to increasingly be Taiwanese benshengren, or Han Taiwanese whose ancestors had already lived in Taiwan before 1949. Taiwanese immigration to the United States began to subside in the early-1980s due to improving economic and political conditions in Taiwan.

Socioeconomics

Education
Taiwanese culture places a high value on education, and many Taiwanese Americans are very highly educated and hold advanced degrees from numerous prestigious universities around the United States. Several distinguished academics, including Nobel Prize winners, are Taiwanese Americans.

Financial and socioeconomic opportunities offered by the United States have lifted many Taiwanese Americans out of poverty, joining the ranks of the America's middle and upper middle class. Estimates indicate that a disproportionate percentage of Taiwanese students attend elite universities despite constituting less than 0.5% of the U.S. population. Taiwanese Americans have the highest education attainment level in the United States, surpassing any other ethnic group in the country, according to U.S Census Bureau data released in 2010. According to the 2010 Labor Statistics from U.S. Census Bureau, 73.6% of all Taiwanese Americans have attained a bachelor's or high degree (compared to 28.2% nationally and 49.9% for all Asian American groups). 80.0% of Taiwanese American men attained a bachelor's degree and 68.3% of Taiwanese American women attained a bachelor's degree. 39.1% of all Taiwanese in the United States possess a master's, doctorate or other professional degree, which is nearly four times the national average.

Employment
Many Taiwanese Americans work as white collar professionals, many of whom are highly educated, salaried professionals whose work is largely self-directed in management, professional and related occupations such as engineering, medicine, investment banking, law, and academia. 66.2% of Taiwanese Americans work in many white collar professions compared to 35.9% for the general American population and 48.1% for Asian Americans. 71.3% of Taiwanese men and 60.4% of Taiwanese women work in management, professional, and related occupations. They also hold some of the lowest unemployment rates in the nation with a figure of 4.3% compared to a national rate of 6.9%. Some of the prominent technology companies in the United States have been founded by Taiwanese Americans such as Morris Chang (founder of TSMC), Min Kao (co-founder of Garmin), Jerry Yang (co-founder of Yahoo), Steve Chen (co-founder of YouTube), Jen-Hsun Huang (co-founder of Nvidia), William Wang (founder of Vizio), Greg Tseng (co-founder of Tagged) and James Chu (founder of Viewsonic).

Economics
According to the 2009 U.S. Census, Taiwanese American men had one of "the highest year-round, full-time median earnings" with a figure of $76,587, whilst Taiwanese American women had a median income of $51,307. Taiwanese Americans have the highest median incomes of any ethnic group in United States with a median income of $68,809, which is roughly 37% percent above the national average. Taiwanese Americans have one of the lowest poverty rates in the US, with a poverty rate of 9.5% compared to 11.3% for the general American population.

Settlement 

Many Taiwanese immigrants have not settled in the old Chinatowns because they do not speak Cantonese. Instead, they have generally immigrated directly to American suburbia and as a result, new suburban Taiwanese communities were formed. For example, in the late 1970s and early 1980s, Taiwanese emigrants were instrumental in the development of Monterey Park, California in Los Angeles  - resulting in the moniker of "Little Taipei" - as well as Flushing, Queens, which generally reflected new investments and capital flowing from Taiwan into newer Taiwanese enclaves instead of traditional Chinatowns.

While Monterey Park is no longer the largest Taiwanese community in Los Angeles today, Flushing remains the main Taiwanese cultural, commercial, and political center in New York City. In Los Angeles County, California, newer communities such as Rowland Heights, Hacienda Heights, Arcadia, San Marino, Diamond Bar, Walnut, San Gabriel, Temple City, are similar to "Little Taipei."  However, many annual Taiwanese cultural events (especially during Taiwanese Heritage Week) are still held in Monterey Park.  As an attempt to duplicate the Taiwanese success of Monterey Park in Houston, Texas, Taiwanese immigrant entrepreneurs established what is now widely considered as Houston's new Chinatown on Bellaire Boulevard in the mid-1980s. A number of Taiwanese American businesses and organizations still operate and flourish in this part of Houston.

The prestige and performance of particular school districts, as well as access to careers in high-tech firms, have played a significant part in influencing the settlement patterns of Taiwanese Americans. Areas with high concentrations of Taiwanese immigrants include the San Gabriel Valley (Greater Los Angeles), Santa Clara Valley (Cupertino, San Jose), East Bay (Dublin, Pleasanton, El Cerrito, Oakland), Los Angeles/Orange County border communities (Cerritos/Artesia), and Irvine in Central Orange County. Outside of California, there are also major Taiwanese concentrations in Flushing, Long Island City, and Forest Hills, all within Queens; Nassau County on Long Island; Jersey City and Hoboken in nearby New Jersey; Rockville, Maryland (northwest of Washington, D.C.); Sugar Land, Texas (near Houston), Plano, Texas (near Dallas); Bellevue, Washington (and adjacent areas) (part of the Greater Seattle Area's "Eastside" communities) and Chandler, Arizona. Additionally, the northeastern suburbs of the Atlanta, Georgia area has also received a significant influx of Taiwanese immigrant residents.

From the middle of the 1980s to the 1990s, large numbers of affluent Taiwanese Americans began moving out to upscale neighborhoods such as Cupertino, San Mateo, Palo Alto, Fremont, Newark, and Pleasanton in the Bay Area; San Marino, Arcadia, South Pasadena, and Temple City in Western San Gabriel Valley; Hacienda Heights, Rowland Heights, Walnut, and Diamond Bar in Eastern San Gabriel Valley; with immigrants from the People's Republic of China and Cantonese and Teochew (mostly from Vietnam) taking their place in Monterey Park, as well as Alhambra. Starting in the 2000s, highly educated Nassau County on Long Island east of New York City, as well as suburbs in northern and central New Jersey, have received a large influx of Taiwanese immigrants.

Albuquerque, New Mexico suburbs have a moderately sized Taiwanese population. 

Similarly, for the past 10 years, Taiwanese have been immigrating to upscale neighborhoods in Los Angeles and Orange County such as Cerritos and Irvine respectively. Cerritos is located in Los Angeles County but borders Orange County and has a large diversity of Asian immigrants. Irvine has a very large Taiwanese population. The Irvine Chinese School, which serves mostly the American-born children of Taiwanese immigrants, is one of the largest Chinese-language schools in the Orange County area.

Taiwanese-oriented strip malls and shopping complexes are typically complete with supermarkets and restaurants. In addition, shops offering imported Taiwanese goods allow for young Taiwanese expatriates in the United States to keep up with the current trends and popular culture of Taiwan.  Taiwanese Americans have also brought with them Taiwanese cuisine to the communities they have settled, which, possibly excluding bubble tea, is not generally well known or served outside these aforementioned Taiwanese immigrant enclaves.

U.S. metropolitan areas with large Taiwanese American populations
The list of metropolitan area with a Taiwanese American population of at least 4,000, .

Politics 
Taiwanese Americans have also gradually increased their political engagement in the public sphere of the U.S. in recent years.

Notable examples include:

 Stephanie Chang (member of the Michigan Senate)
 Elaine Chao (United States Secretary of Labor in the George W. Bush Administration, and Secretary of Transportation in the Donald Trump Administration)
 Raymond Chen (United States Circuit Judge on the U.S. Court of Appeals for the Federal Circuit)
 Lanhee Chen (2022 California State Controller candidate and policy director and chief policy adviser to the 2012 Mitt Romney presidential campaign).
 John Chiang (California State Controller)
 David Chiu (City Attorney of San Francisco and former member of the California State Assembly)
 Shing-Fu Hsueh (Mayor of West Windsor, New Jersey)
 Ted Lieu (member of the United States House of Representatives, representing California's 33rd congressional district.)
 Goodwin Liu (Associate Justice of the Supreme Court of California)
 Jessie K. Liu (former United States Attorney for the District of Columbia)
 John Liu (former Comptroller of New York City)
 Grace Meng (member of the United States House of Representatives, representing New York's 6th congressional district in the New York City borough of Queens, elected in 2008)
 Yuh-Line Niou (member of the New York State Assembly, representing the 65th District in Lower Manhattan, elected in November 2016)
 David Wu (former U.S. Representative, 1st Taiwan born Congressman)
 Sherman Wu (civil rights activist and scientist)
 Michelle Wu (Mayor of Boston, elected 2021, former member of the Boston City Council).
 Andrew Yang (Mayoral candidate in the 2021 New York City Democratic primary, presidential candidate in the 2020 Democratic primary, and founder of Venture for America)  
 Yiaway Yeh (former Mayor of Palo Alto, California)

First generation immigrants and later generations 
First and second generation immigrants from Taiwan usually share a common language, Mandarin, although many also speak Taiwanese Hokkien, and to a lesser extent, Hakka. Many first generation immigrants educated before 1945 speak Japanese as their second native language. As with most immigrants to the United States, linguistic fluency in the heritage language quickly disappears in the second generation. Immigrants whose families are from the Taipei metropolitan area usually speak Mandarin as their primary language. There are many first generation Taiwanese immigrants of full Hakka heritage who speak all three languages. Some Taiwanese Americans of mixed Hoklo and Hakka Heritage speak only Mandarin as their primary language.

Organizations 
Organizations geared towards Taiwanese Americans include the Formosan Association for Public Affairs (FAPA), North America Taiwanese Professors Association (NATPA), Taiwanese American Citizens League (TACL), Taiwanese American Professionals (TAP) and Intercollegiate Taiwanese American Students Association (ITASA). In addition, most cities with concentrations of Taiwanese Americans have a Taiwanese association or Taiwan Center.

The first Taiwanese church in North America, the Winfield Reformed Church in Woodside, Queens, in New York City, was established in 1969.

In 1986, Chaotian Temple from Taiwan has also established a branch temple known as Ma-Tsu Temple in San Francisco Chinatown with the support of Taiwanese American community.

Media 
Taiwanese Americans also run several of North America's major Chinese-language newspapers, such as the World Journal based in Queens; and the Chicago Chinese News. However, these influential and highly circulated newspapers are not geared solely to Taiwanese immigrants, but also serve a broader Chinese-speaking immigrant readership.  Pacific Journal is a weekly Taiwanese-run newspaper that is geared more exclusively toward Taiwanese readers.

Due to the significant Taiwanese American community, Taiwanese media dominates the Chinese-language airwaves in the United States.  Cable and satellite television of Taiwan-based media keeps Taiwanese Americans abreast of news developments and programming in Taiwan. For example, satellite stations ETTV America and CTI cater to Mandarin-speaking Taiwanese immigrants.

Taiwanese nationality and residency

In the 1960s, many Taiwanese Americans chose to make America their permanent home and had children in the U.S. Most sought refuge from the numerous arrests and executions during the White Terror era of the KMT, the political party which had dictatorially ruled the country. By the late 1970s, improving economic conditions in Taiwan slowed the rate of immigration. During the 1990s, political liberalization in Taiwan encouraged many who had left Taiwan for political reasons to return.

Although the oath of naturalization of the United States contains a statement renouncing "allegiance and fidelity" to other countries, the Republic of China (the formal name of Taiwan) does not recognize this renunciation as sufficient for the termination of ROC nationality, and requires a person who wishes to renounce ROC nationality to take another oath before an ROC consular officer. All renunciations are subject to approval from the Ministry of the Interior, and the Ministry may deny a person's application under Taiwanese law. Without formal renunciation, the ROC government considers its emigrants with American citizenship to continue to be nationals of the ROC. Acquiring US citizenship has no effect on the holder's status as a national of ROC, which makes Taiwan-born Americans still eligible to vote in the ROC elections, provided that their household registration is still intact in Taiwan.

Unlike their Taiwan-born parents, the American-born second generation do not have household registration in Taiwan at birth, making them nationals without household registration (NWOHRs), despite the fact that they are also ROC nationals under Taiwanese law. In contrast with those with household registration in Taiwan, NWOHRs cannot receive a Taiwanese National Identification Card, do not have right of abode in Taiwan, and are subject to immigration control while in Taiwan. They are, however, eligible for a Taiwan passport. It is possible for NWOHRs to be registered as nationals with household registration (NWHRs) if they meet the requirements listed under the Immigration Act of Taiwan.

Connection to politics of Taiwan 
Politically, Taiwanese Americans play an active role in the politics and culture of the country, aided in large part by recognition of dual citizenship. The identity politics of Taiwan also influences at least first generation Taiwanese Americans. Many government officials, including presidents Tsai Ing-wen, Ma Ying-jeou, and Lee Teng-hui, have received graduate degrees in the United States. The United States was also a major destination for anti-KMT figures such as Peng Ming-min and Chai Trong-rong, where they were politically exiled. Others, including Nobel Prize laureate Yuan T. Lee were educated in the United States.

The close connection between Taiwan and the United States has led to some interesting political dynamics. From time to time, the issue of loyalty to Taiwan is raised – for example, in 2008, during his successful Presidential campaign, the fact that Ma Ying-Jeou has sisters and a daughter who are American citizens was criticized. James Soong has been criticized for having extensive property holdings in the United States and for the fact that his children are American citizens. Several legislators and government officials in the KMT have been controversially alleged to have permanent U.S. residency status or U.S. citizenship without renouncement while serving in public office. Similarly, loyalty was raised as an issue in the feud between Li Ao and Yuan T. Lee, whose children are also American citizens. This issue is partly one of socio-economic status as Taiwanese with extensive connections within the United States are considered wealthier and more privileged than the average Taiwanese.

However, this issue has not become a large part of Taiwanese political discourse, largely because links with the United States are so extensive on both sides of the political spectrum that no one can use this issue to gain a significant political advantage. Both the pan-Blue coalition and pan-Green coalition rely on Taiwanese Americans for votes. In the 2004 ROC Presidential Election, both coalitions campaigned extensively in the United States. An estimated 10,000 Taiwanese Americans traveled to Taiwan to vote in the election. In the 2020 Taiwanese presidential election, tens of thousands of Taiwanese Americans traveled to Taiwan to vote in the election.

While dual citizens are banned from high political office, there has not been a significant movement within Taiwan to ban dual citizenship in general. Taiwan's Supreme Court has ruled that all citizens, dual or singular, are entitled to the same rights. US natural born citizens were included in the decision.

Notable people

See also

 List of Taiwanese Americans
 Hong Kong Americans
 Chinese Americans
 Hoklo Americans
 Hakka Americans
 Taiwanese people
 Han Taiwanese
 Taipei Economic and Cultural Representative Office
 Taiwan-United States relations
 Taiwanese people in New York City
 Taiwanese Americans in Los Angeles

References

Bibliography

 
 
 Jones, J. Sydney, "Taiwanese Americans." Gale Encyclopedia of Multicultural America, edited by Thomas Riggs, (3rd ed., vol. 4, Gale, 2014), pp. 343–356. Online

External links
 History of Taiwanese Americans 
 Formosan Association for Public Affairs
 ITASA - Intercollegiate Taiwanese American Students Association
 UMCP TASA - University of Maryland College Park Taiwanese American Student Association
 Taiwanese American Citizens League
 Taiwanese American Foundation
 TaiwaneseAmerican.org
 Taiwan Center of America
 Taiwanese American Professionals
 U.S. Census 2000 - People Born in Taiwan

Asian-American society